The Poqet PC is a very small, portable IBM PC compatible computer, introduced in 1989 by Poqet Computer Corporation with a price of $2000. The computer was discontinued after Fujitsu Ltd. bought Poqet Computer Corp. It was the first subnotebook form factor IBM PC compatible computer that ran MS-DOS. The Poqet PC is powered by two AA-size batteries. Through the use of aggressive power management, which includes stopping the CPU between keystrokes, the batteries are able to power the computer for anywhere between a couple of weeks and a couple of months, depending on usage. The computer also uses an "instant on" feature, such that after powering it down, it can be used again immediately without having to go through a full booting sequence. The Poqet PC is comparable to the HP 95LX/HP 100LX/HP 200LX and the Atari Portfolio handheld computers.

Poqet PC, "Classic" and Prime
Three variants were produced. The Poqet PC was the first to be introduced and the Poqet PC Prime followed shortly after. (The original version was subsequently renamed the Poqet PC "Classic"). Several years later, the Poqet PC Plus was introduced. The main difference between the Poqet PC Classic and the Prime was the expansion of RAM from 512 to 640 KB and enhancement of the power management features.

Specifications
 Size:  x  x 
 Weight:  with batteries
 Battery life: 50–100 hours (expect a lot less if running long, CPU-intensive programs (10-20 h approx.))
 Microprocessor: 80C88 / 7 MHz
 Memory: 640 KB SRAM
 Display: Reflective DSTN (no backlight)
 Display compatibility: MDA: 80 × 25 characters CGA: 640 × 200 pixels
 PCMCIA: 2 × Type I, Revision 1.0 memory card slots
 Secondary storage: Drive A: 512 KB-2 MB PCMCIA (not included) Drive B: 512-2 MB PCMCIA (not included) Drive C: 768 KB ROM drive with MS-DOS 3.3 and PoqetTools Drive D: 22 KB volatile RAM drive
 Built-in software: MS-DOS 3.3, PoqetLink, and PoqetTools

Poqet PC Plus

Several years after the Poqet Prime and Classic, and some time after Fujitsu purchased Poqet Computer Corp., the new and improved Poqet PC Plus was introduced. The Poqet PC Plus had significant differences from the Classic and Prime models, some better than others. It features a rechargeable battery pack that holds a smaller charge than the "Classic", enhanced PC Card slots that now support more PC Cards, a transflective backlit LCD and 2 MB of RAM (640 KB to DOS, 64 KB shadow, and 1-1344 KB for a RAM disk). The Poqet "Classic"'s LCD didn't have a backlight and was more prone to breaking than the Poqet PC Plus. It also only took Type I, Release 1.0 SRAM cards, as opposed to Type II cards and Release 2.0 cards, including flash, SRAM, and a few modem cards. The Plus also had more memory. Despite many improvements, the Plus also had its drawbacks. The Poqet PC Plus was considerably larger and heavier than its predecessors. It also has a very odd miniature 26-pin serial connector for which there is no currently available adapter. However, many Toshiba external floppy drives and dongles used this same JAE connector. An amateur radio hobbyist who uses a Poqet has found a way to make a suitable adapter. It also is not totally PCMCIA Release 2.0 compatible, so not all memory cards will work, and, as Bryan Mason says on his Poqet site, only the "PNB Samantha modem, Megahertz 14.4 kbit/s modem with XJACK, and the AT&T Paradyne KeepInTouch 14.4 kbit/s modems" will work in it. In addition, not all CompactFlash cards work in the Poqet. Users have found that many machines do not work with newer CF cards.

Specifications
 Size:  x  x 
 Weight:  w/batteries
 Battery life: 3–12 hours (application dependent)
 Microprocessor: NEC V30 at 16 MHz
 Memory: 2 MB (Memory above 640 KB is configurable as EMS or a RAM disk. 64 KB is reserved for shadow BIOS.)
 Display: Transflective LCD with backlight on demand.  diagonal size.
 Display compatibility: MDA: 80 x 25 characters CGA: 640 x 200 pixels
 Expansion: 2 × Type II PCMCIA slots (nearly compatible with PCMCIA Revision 2.0.) 1 × TTL serial port  1 × TTL/RS-232 serial port (configurable)
 PCMCIA Compatibility: Supports SunDisk (SanDisk) ATA Flash, 3.3 V and 5 V SRAM; AT&T Paradyne KeepInTouch modem, Megahertz PCMCIA 14.4 kbit/s modem with XJACK, and PNB Samantha modem.
 Secondary storage: Drive A: Left PCMCIA slot Drive B: Right PCMCIA slot Drive C: ROM drive with MS-DOS 5.0  Drive D: 784 KB Flash drive Drive E: RAM drive (if configured)
 Built-in software: MS-DOS 5.0, EMS driver, RAM Disk driver, Flash utility, barcode reader, PenConnect serial communications software, PCMCIA driver.

Reception

The Poqet PC was one of the first subnotebooks to exist in the marketplace, and still today is one of the smallest, although it is beaten by the HP 200LX. It was immediately recognized as a milestone in portable computing when PC Magazine awarded the Poqet PC development team (Ian H. S. Cullimore, John P. Fairbanks, Leroy D. Harper, Shinpei Ichikawa, Stavro Evangelo Prodromou) its coveted Technical Excellence Award for 1989. The same device that PC World called "one of the 50 greatest gadgets of the last 50 years" had a very short lifespan, from only about 1989-1994. After Poqet was bought by Fujitsu, the Poqet was soon axed. For a short time Poqet value declined, with the onset of Windows CE. A similar decline in HP 200LX demand also occurred after the introduction of HP Windows CE machines. However, despite the new machines' power, their operating system soon proved to be inefficient. The Poqets and HP 'LX' DOS machines became very high in demand. Poqets also are in fairly high demand, but fetch somewhat lower prices. A Cherry Hill, NJ business, Disks 'n' Data, once had a stock of Classics and Pluses. As the owner of the store, Jerry Tessler, put it: "I sold them all in twenty minutes." Unlike running Windows CE, running DOS in near-standard specifications meant that everything from Lotus 1-2-3 to Zork worked as expected.

See also
 Atari Portfolio
 Zeos Pocket PC
 HP 95LX
 HP 100LX
 HP 200LX
 HP 1000CX
 HP OmniGo 700LX
 Toshiba Libretto
 Fujitsu Lifebook
 Subnotebook
 Netbook
 Palmtop PC
 Ultra-mobile PC (UMPC)

References

Sources
 California Digital. 2006. 2006-12-22.
 Mason, Bryan. The Poqet PC Home Page. 2006. 2006-12-25.
 Poqet PC Plus Serial Adapter. 2005. 2006-12-22.
 Wong, Al. Al's Review of Fujitsu's Poqet PC Plus. 2001. 2006-12-23.

Citations

Further reading

External links
 The Poqet PC Home Page A collection of Poqet information, along with documentation, software downloads, and FAQs.
 A Poqet PC Wiki is a wiki about the Poqet PC that is currently under construction.
 Fujitsu's Home Page The company that eventually sold Poqets later on in the series' short lifespan.
 Poqet PC ... QRPer's field computing dream! A page on the Poqet used for ham radio. Many links and much info.
 Poqet PC Plus Serial Adapter Making a Poqet PC Plus serial adapter.
 California Digital sells Poqet PC Pluses and accessories.
 Poqet PC A review of the Classic by Tom Carlson.
 PC World - The 50 Greatest Gadgets of the Past 50 Years mentions the Poqet computer in a part of its article
 PC Magazine also mentioned the Poqet PC in this article
 New York Times May 14, 1989 "The Big News in Tiny Computers" by John Markoff

IBM PC compatibles
Personal digital assistants
Subnotebooks
Computer-related introductions in 1989